The following outline is provided as an overview of and topical guide to New York City:

New York City – largest city in the state of New York and most populous city in the United States. New York City has been described as the cultural, financial, and media capital of the world, and exerts a significant impact upon the world's commerce, entertainment, research, technology, education, politics, and sports. If New York City were a country, it would have the 12th highest GDP in the world. It is the most economically powerful city and the leading financial center of the world — anchored by Wall Street in the Financial District of Lower Manhattan, and home to the world's two largest stock exchanges by total market capitalization, the New York Stock Exchange and NASDAQ.

General reference 

 About New York City's names
 Pronunciation: 
 Common English name(s): New York City
 Official English name(s): City of New York
 Nicknames of New York City
 The Big Apple
 The Capital of the World
 The Center of the Universe
 The City So Nice They Named It Twice ("New York, New York")
 The City That Never Sleeps
 The Empire City
 The Five Boroughs
 Fun City
 Gotham
 The Melting Pot
 Metropolis
 The Modern Gomorrah
 New Amsterdam
 Adjectival(s): New York
 Demonym(s): New Yorker, Knickerbocker
 Books about New York City

Geography of New York City 

Geography of New York City
 New York City is:
 a city
 Primate city of the United States
 Population of New York City: 8,804,190 (as of April 1, 2020) 
 Area of New York City:  468.484 sq mi (1,213.37 km2)
 Atlas of New York City

Location of New York City 

 New York City is situated within the following regions:
 Northern Hemisphere and Western Hemisphere
 North America
 Northern America
 United States
 Eastern United States
 East Coast of the United States
 Northeastern United States
 Northeast megalopolis
 Mid-Atlantic
 New York State
 New York metropolitan area
  New York City occupies 5 counties, coinciding with its 5 boroughs
 Bronx County (The Bronx)
 Kings County (Brooklyn)
 New York County (Manhattan)
 Queens County (Queens)
 Richmond County (Staten Island)
 Time zone(s): UTC−05:00 (Eastern Time Zone)

Environment of New York City 

 Environmental issues in New York City
Food and water in New York City

Landforms of New York City 

 Islands of New York City

Areas of New York City

Boroughs of New York City 

 Boroughs of New York City – the city has 5:
 The Bronx
 Brooklyn
 Manhattan
 Queens
 Staten Island

Neighborhoods in New York City 

Neighborhoods in New York City
 New York City ethnic enclaves

Locations in New York City

Parks and gardens in New York City 

Parks and gardens in New York City
 Parks in New York City
 Central Park
 Flushing Meadows–Corona Park
 Forest Park (Queens)
 Pelham Bay Park
 Prospect Park (Brooklyn)
 Staten Island Greenbelt
 Van Cortlandt Park
 Zoos in New York City
 Bronx Zoo
 Central Park Zoo
 Prospect Park Zoo
 Queens Zoo
 Staten Island Zoo

Historic locations in New York City 

 List of National Historic Landmarks in New York City

Demographics of New York City 

Demographics of New York City
 Demographic history of New York City

Government and politics of New York City 

Government and politics of New York City
 Government of New York City
 Mayor of New York City
 New York City mayoral elections
 Mayors of New York City
 New York City Council
 Borough president
 Law enforcement in New York City
 New York City Police Department
 Crime in New York City
 Graffiti in New York City
 International relations of New York City
 Headquarters of the United Nations
 Sister cities of New York City

History of New York City 

History of New York City
 Timeline of New York City

History of New York City, by period and event 

 Timeline of New York City
 Timeline of labor in New York City
 1962–63 New York City newspaper strike
 1966 New York City transit strike
 1980 New York City transit strike
 1984 New York City Subway shooting
 2001 September 11 attacks
 2005 New York City transit strike
 2006 New York City plane crash
 2017 New York City transit crisis
 2017 New York City truck attack
 COVID-19 pandemic in New York City

History of New York City, by subject 

 Demographic history of New York City
 History of the New York City Subway

Culture of New York City 

Culture of New York City
 Architecture of New York City
 Art Deco architecture of New York City
 Buildings, sites, and monuments in New York City
 Tallest building in New York City
 Cuisine of New York City
 Language in New York City
 New York City English
 Media in New York City
 Museums and cultural institutions in New York City
 Museums in New York City
 People from New York City
 "Sixth borough"
 Symbols of New York City
 Flags of New York City
 Seal of New York City
 Tourism in New York City
 List of New York City gardens
 Lists of New York City landmarks
 List of New York City parks

Art in New York City 

 New York City arts organizations
 Graffiti in New York City

Cinema of New York City 

 Films set in New York City

Music of New York City 

Music of New York City
 Songs about New York City

Religion in New York City 

 Judaism in New York City
 History of the Jews in New York City

Sports in New York City 

Sports in New York City
 Baseball in New York City
 Baseball parks in New York City
 Basketball in New York City
 Football in New York City
 Soccer in New York City
 Running in New York City
 New York City Marathon

Economy and infrastructure of New York City 

Economy of New York City
 Communications in New York City
 Media in New York City
 Companies based in New York City
 Public services in New York City
 Emergency services in New York City
 Hospitals in New York City
 New York City Fire Department
 New York City Police Department
 Libraries
 Brooklyn Public Library
 New York Public Library
 Queens Library
 Tourism in New York City

Transportation in New York City 

Transport in New York City
 History of transportation in New York City
 Transport agencies in New York City
 New York City Department of Transportation
 New York City Board of Transportation (defunct)
 Vision Zero Initiative
 Metropolitan Transportation Authority – manages:
 New York City Subway
 MTA Regional Bus Operations
 Long Island Rail Road
 Metro-North Railroad
 Air transport in New York City
 Airports in New York City
 Maritime transport in New York City
 Port of New York City
 Rail transit in New York City
 New York City Subway
 Long Island Rail Road
 Metro-North Railroad
 PATH
 Road transport in New York City
 MTA Regional Bus Operations
 Cycling in New York City
 Bridges and tunnels in New York City

Education in New York City 

Education in New York City
 New York City Department of Education
 List of public elementary schools in New York City
 List of high schools in New York City
 Secondary education in New York City
 Colleges and universities in New York City
 University of New York City

See also 

 Outline of geography
 Lists of New York City topics

References

External links 

New York City
New York City